Gawanga Rural LLG is a local-level government (LLG) of East Sepik Province, Papua New Guinea. The Kwanga language is spoken in this LLG.

Wards
01. Apangai
02. Yambanakor 1
03. Yambinakor 2
04. Asanakor
05. Inakor
06. Apos
07. Daina
08. Masalagar
09. Wasambu
10. Bongomasi
11. Wahaukia
12. Bongos
13. Kuyor
14. Kuatengisi
15. Mamsi
16. Kubriwat 1
17. Kubriwat 2
18. Tau 1
19. Tau 2
20. Wamenokor
21. Sauke Aucheli
22. Surumburombo

References

Local-level governments of East Sepik Province